"We Got the Beat" is a song by the American rock band the Go-Go's, written by the group's lead guitarist and keyboardist Charlotte Caffey. The band first recorded the song in 1980 for a single on UK-based Stiff Records, and later rerecorded it for their debut album Beauty and the Beat on I.R.S. Records. The initial single release brought the Go-Go's underground credibility during their first UK tour and in the band's hometown of Los Angeles. The first version reached No. 35 on the U.S. Hot Dance Club Play chart due to its popularity in clubs as an import, and the second version was a top 10 hit in both the United States and Canada. It is considered a new wave classic hit, as well as being the Go-Go's' signature song. The song was named one of "The Rock and Roll Hall of Fame's 500 Songs that Shaped Rock and Roll".

Background, composition and release

"We Got the Beat" evolved in part out of the Go-Go's covering the Smokey Robinson song that served as the group's namesake: The Miracles' "Going to a Go Go" (1965). Taking inspiration from that, and from the opening theme of The Twilight Zone, lead guitarist Charlotte Caffey wrote "We Got the Beat" and offered it to the band with hesitation, afraid that it would not be punk enough for the other members' tastes. When the rest of the Go-Go's heard the song, they loved it – and its incorporation into their set marked a stylistic change for the group as they moved away from punk rock and toward a more pop sensibility that would align the Go-Go's in with the music that was being termed "new wave".

Go-Go's manager Ginger Canzoneri secured a deal with British indie label Stiff Records to release the original version of "We Got the Beat" as a single, in support of the band's 1980 UK tour with Madness and the Specials. In the 2020 documentary The Go-Go's, Canzoneri recalled that Stiff Records had also wanted to secure publishing rights for "We Got the Beat" and its B-side, "How Much More" (both produced by Paul L. Wexler), but she declined, thinking it was important for the band to hold the publishing rights to their own songs.

After the tumultuous UK tour, the Go-Go's returned home to Los Angeles and packed clubs when they performed, due to the single's popularity – leading them to finally sign a deal with newly established I.R.S. Records. The band headed to New York City to record their debut album at Pennylane Studio, where producer Richard Gottehrer advised the group to slow their songs down. "We Got the Beat" remained an exception to this advice, though the band lengthened it slightly by adding a few bars to the song's instrumental intro.

"We Got the Beat" led off the second side of the Go-Go's debut album, Beauty and the Beat, released in July 1981. It served as the album's second single in January 1982, now with another album track, "Can't Stop the World", on its B-side. Clocking in at  minutes, the second studio version of the song is recognizable by its drumming intro. The song's lyrics mention various early 1960s dances such as the Pony, the Watusi, and Go-Go dancing.

The song's music video, filmed at a live performance at Palos Verdes High School in Los Angeles on December 4, 1981, received heavy airplay on MTV at the time. It gained further exposure when it was used in the opening sequence of director Amy Heckerling's film Fast Times at Ridgemont High, released in August 1982.

The Go-Go's performed the song, along with "Vacation" and "Our Lips Are Sealed", during the 2021 Rock and Roll Hall of Fame Induction Ceremony.

Reception
Cash Box said "The Grammy Awards-nominated Go-Go's continue on their winning ways with this new recording of the cut that started it all for the girls in 1980 as an English single on stiff, punchy, to-the-point power-pop."  Billboard called it a "catchy rocker" that has "the same endearing charm" as "Our Lips Are Sealed."

Chart performance
"We Got the Beat" became the Go-Go's biggest hit, spending three weeks at No. 2 on the U.S. Billboard Hot 100, behind Joan Jett & the Blackhearts' "I Love Rock 'n Roll". It was during the song's time in the U.S. top 10 that Beauty and the Beat topped the U.S. Billboard 200.

Weekly charts

Year-end charts

Track listing 
UK 7" Single (1980, Stiff Records)
 "We Got the Beat" (Caffey)
 "How Much More" (Caffey/Wiedlin)

UK 7" Single (1981, I.R.S. Records)
 "We Got the Beat" (Caffey)
 "Skidmarks on My Heart" (Caffey/Carlisle)

US 7" Single (1981, I.R.S. Records)
 "We Got the Beat" (Caffey) - 2:30
 "Can't Stop the World" (Valentine) - 3:22

Debby Ryan version
A cover of "We Got the Beat" was recorded in 2012 by American singer-songwriter Debby Ryan from the soundtrack of the movie Radio Rebel. It was produced by Matthew Gerrard, Ali Dee Theodore and Matthew Tishler. 

A music video was released on Disney Channel on February 13, 2012. The video was directed by Ryan and choreographed by Alyson Stoner.

References

1980 singles
1982 singles
The Go-Go's songs
2012 singles
Debby Ryan songs
Songs written by Charlotte Caffey
Song recordings produced by Richard Gottehrer
1980 songs
I.R.S. Records singles
Stiff Records singles
A&M Records singles